Jeff Van Wagenen (born July 16, 1948) is an American professional golfer who played on the European Seniors Tour and PGA Tour Champions from 1998 to 2008.

Professional wins (1)

European Senior Tour wins (1)

References

External links

American male golfers
European Senior Tour golfers
Golfers from Phoenix, Arizona
1948 births
Living people